Edible Communities is a group of independently owned local food magazines in North America, numbering 81 as of June 2013.  Edible Communities is a publishing and information services company that creates community-based, local-foods publications in culinary regions throughout the United States and Canada.

History
It was founded by Tracey Ryder and Carole Topalian in 2002 in Ojai, California.  consists of 81 Edible magazines in North America. Each magazine has culinary news tailored to the local area. Local publishers pay a licensing fee and a royalty fee to Edible Communities, Inc.

References

External links

2002 establishments in California
Food and drink magazines
Magazines established in 2002
Magazines published in California
Monthly magazines published in the United States